Sosnowo may refer to the following places:

Sosnowo, Gmina Bargłów Kościelny, Podlaskie Voivodeship, Poland
Sosnowo, Gmina Sztabin, Podlaskie Voivodeship, Poland
Sosnowo, Gryfino County, West Pomeranian Voivodeship, Poland
Sosnowo, Kuyavian-Pomeranian Voivodeship, Poland
Sosnowo, Łobez County, West Pomeranian Voivodeship, Poland
Sosnowo, Masovian Voivodeship, Poland

See also
 
 Sosnovo, the name of several rural localities in Russia